The Des Moines Buccaneers are a Tier I junior ice hockey team in the United States Hockey League (USHL). The team has played in the Western Conference since the 2009–10 season.

History
The Buccaneers began USHL play during the 1980–81 season and have played all their home games at Buccaneer Arena located in Urbandale, Iowa, outside of Des Moines. The Buccaneers have won four Anderson Cup championships (1993–94, 1994–95, 1997–98 and 1998–99) and four Clark Cup championships (1992, 1995, 1999 and 2006) in their history. 

The Buccaneers  also won three Gold Cups (in 1992, 1995, and 1998) for the Junior A National Championship awarded prior USA Hockey's 2001 realignment that shifted the USHL to Tier I status. 

The Buccaneers have also had many players continue to play hockey after completing their USHL career in Des Moines.  Many players have been given scholarships and move on to play NCAA Division I hockey, while others have gone on to play professional hockey.  Most notably, Scott Clemmensen, a native of Des Moines, played for the Buccaneers before going to Boston College to play NCAA Division I hockey and then onto the New Jersey Devils and the Florida Panthers. 

Clemmensen later became a co-owner of the Buccaneers as part of Orchard View Sports & Entertainment that purchased the team in 2017. Kyle Okposo, who played on the 2005–06 Clark Cup championship team prior to playing for the University of Minnesota and is now playing for the Buffalo Sabres.

Arena
The Bucaneers played their home games at Buccaneer Arena since their inception. The arena, built in 1962, is nicknamed "The Madhouse on Hickman." In 2020, the arena was damaged during the August 2020 Midwest derecho and the team was forced to start the 2020–21 season at Wells Fargo Arena in downtown Des Moines. In November 2020, the team announced it would be replacing the old arena as part of a new development at Merle Hay Mall. The project will see a 3,500 seat main arena built in what was a Younkers department store, plus other disused sections of the mall turned into three additional community sheets of ice and a 150-room hotel. Buccaneer Arena re-opened in January 2021, where the teams plans to play until the new center is complete.

Season-by-season record

Gold Cup tournament
The Gold Cup was the USA Hockey Junior A National Championship that the USHL participated in at the end of the season against the regular season and playoff champions of the other Junior A leagues. The USHL stopped participation in the tournament after USA Hockey realigned its designations and the USHL became a Tier I league in 2001. The Gold Cup was discontinued after the 2003 tournament when the remaining Tier II Junior A leagues merged. Des Moines participated in five Gold Cup tournaments and won three Junior A National Championships.

Roster
As of September 21, 2022.

|}

Coaches
Ivan Prediger (1980–1984) – Resigned during the 1984–85 season. Jeff Ulrich was then named interim head coach.
Jim Wiley (1984–1990) – Replaced interim head coach Jeff Ulrich during the 1984–85 season.
Bob Ferguson (1990–1995, 2001–2004)
Scott Owens (1995–1999)
Tom Carroll (1999–2001)
Regg Simon (2004–2008, 2010–2012) – Resigned during the 2007–08 season after 45 games. Replaced by interim Todd Knott. Rehired in 2010 to replace Guentzel, but was then fired towards the end of the 2011–12 season and replaced by interim Graham Johnson.
J. P. Parisé (2008–2009) – Replaced interim head coach Knott but kept him on as an assistant. Became general manager of the Buccaneers in 2009 and vacated the coaching position.
Mike Guentzel (2009–2010) – Dave Allison was originally hired for the 2009–10 season but then left the team prior to coaching a game due to immigration and work-visa concerns.
Jon Rogger (2012–2014) – Replaced interim head coach Graham Johnson.
Dave Allison (2014–2018)
Gene Reilly (2018–2019)
Peter Mannino (2019–2021)
Matt Curley (2021–present)

References

External links
Des Moines Buccaneers website
 Des Moines Buccaneers Cup Records
 Des Moines Buccaneers HockeyDB

United States Hockey League teams
Sports in Des Moines, Iowa
Ice hockey teams in Iowa
1980 establishments in Iowa
Ice hockey clubs established in 1980
Urbandale, Iowa